The 2000–01 season Borussia Dortmund began on 11 August 2000 with a Fußball-Bundesliga match against Hansa Rostock, and ended on 19 May 2001, last matchday of the Bundesliga, with a match against 1. FC Köln.
In that season Borussia Dortmund became the first—and so far the only—publicly traded club on the German stock market.

Transfers

Summer transfers

In:

Out:

Winter transfers

In:

Out:

Statistics

Goals and appearances

|}

Results

Bundesliga

Note: Results are given with Borussia Dortmund score listed first.

League table

DFB-Pokal

Note: Results are given with Borussia Dortmund score listed first.

See also
2000–01 Fußball-Bundesliga
2000–01 DFB-Pokal
Borussia Dortmund

Borussia Dortmund seasons
Borussia Dortmund